Rudolf Jeny (also spelt as Jenny, Jeney or Jenei; 2 March 1901 – 14 May 1975) was a Hungarian football player and manager.

Career

Playing career
Jeny was born in Budapest. A forward, Jeny played club football for hometown side Kispest AC and MTK Budapest. He also represented the Hungarian national side at the 1924 Summer Olympics, and earned a total of 20 caps for the team between 1919 and 1926.

Coaching career
Jeny managed Spanish side Atlético Madrid between 1930 and 1933, Portuguese side Sporting Clube de Portugal in 1933–34 and Győri ETO FC in 1955.

References

External links

1901 births
1975 deaths
Association football forwards
Hungarian footballers
Hungary international footballers
Olympic footballers of Hungary
Footballers at the 1924 Summer Olympics
Hungarian football managers
MTK Budapest FC players
Sporting CP footballers
Atlético Madrid managers
CSM Jiul Petroșani managers
Sporting CP managers
Vasas SC managers
Győri ETO FC managers
Zalaegerszegi TE managers
Footballers from Budapest

Hungarian expatriate sportspeople in Portugal